Cacostola zanoa is a species of beetle in the family Cerambycidae. It was described by Dillon and Dillon in 1946. It is known from Bolivia.

References

Cacostola
Beetles described in 1946